The Kursk Nuclear Power Plant (Russian: Курская АЭС []) is a nuclear power plant located in western Russia on the bank of the Seym River about 40 kilometers west of the city of Kursk. The nearby town of Kurchatov was founded when construction of the plant began. The plant feeds the grid for Kursk Oblast and 19 other regions.

Planning and construction 
The decision to construct the Kursk NPP was made in the mid 1960s. This was followed by the beginning of on-site construction in 1971. The plant was intended to suffice the growing energy demands of the quickly developing industrial complex of the Kursk Magnetic Anomaly (Stary-Oskol and Mikhaylovsk ore mining and processing factories and other manufacturing companies). The general designer of Kursk NPP was Atomenergoproject (Moscow); the general contractor - the Research and Development Institute of Power Engineering (Moscow); the research manager – Kurchatov Institute. The construction was executed by the Department for the Construction of Kursk NPP (presently Kurskatomenergostroy Ltd.).

The structure of the Kursk I plant is almost identical to Chernobyl's structure having 2 first generation RBMK blocks followed by 2 second generation blocks. The 1991 American television movie Chernobyl: The Final Warning used the Kursk plant and the neighbouring town of Kurchatov to stand in for Chernobyl Nuclear Power Plant and Pripyat.

Specifications 
Kursk NPP is a one-circuit plant: the steam supplied to the turbines is produced inside the reactor by the boiling coolant (ordinary demineralized water circulating inside a circuit). For condensing the steam the plant uses water from a 21.5 sq m cooling pond.

Kursk NPP has four RBMK-1000 reactors (1000 MW each) and is building new ones. The 1st unit was launched in 1976, the 2nd in 1979, the 3rd in 1983 and the 4th in 1985. Kursk NPP is one of the three biggest NPPs and one of the four biggest electricity producers in Russia (along with Balakovo and Leningrad NPPs and Sayano-Shushink WPP).

Kursk NPP is an important part of the United Energy System of Russia. Its key consumer is the Center energy system covering 19 regions of the Central Federal District. Kursk NPP produces 52% of the total output of all electric power plants of Chernozemye (Black Earth Belt). It feeds 90% of the industry of Kursk region. It also supplies electricity to northern and north-eastern Ukraine.

As of Jan 1 2006 the plant had generated 560 billion kWh. Today Kursk NPP is the key energy supplier of Central Chernozemye, a region that produces 48% of iron ore, 13.5% of steel, 19% of ferrous metals, 9.6% of meat, 19.5% of sugar in Russia. The development of that region is largely credited to the Kursk NPP as it provides power, and a stable source of both employment and income for the communities around it.

Shutdown 
Although the Kursk I plant has been a major success for the local area, as the reactors age they begin to require much longer and more costly maintenance outages compared to modern reactor types with greater efficiency.

In 2015, Rosenergoatom proposed that the Kursk 1 RBMK would be shut down in 2023, followed by the unit 2 in 2027. The third and fourth units are scheduled to close in 2029 and 2031 respectively.

On December 19, 2021, exactly 45 years to the day since it began operation, Kursk I Unit 1 RBMK shut down. In total Kursk's four RBMK-1000 units have generated 987 billion kWh of electricity while simultaneously providing district heating to nearby towns and process heat to industry.

Kursk II VVER 

With the aging RBMK reactors reaching end of life, because of how heavily the surrounding area relies on this site,  a replacement was necessary. The new VVER-TOI reactor was chosen as this site would be the pioneering power station with this reactor type.

Civil construction began in 2017 with the excavation of an estimated 1.2 million cubic metres of soil, as part of the construction work on the two new units. More than 800,000m³ of sand and gravel mixture was laid at the base of the NPP II buildings and structures.

Formation of the sand and gravel coating of unit one was completed in October 2017, while the first concrete layer (concrete bedding) under the foundation plate was assembled in November 2017.

The first 16t reinforced concrete block was installed on the rebar of the lower foundation belt in December 2017. The foundation will comprise 105 reinforced concrete blocks with a total weight of 1,600t.

More than 16,000m³ of self-compacting concrete mix is proposed to be laid in the foundation slab of the reactor building, while the works are expected to be completed by June 2018.

The NPP construction works also included the engineering networks – steam pipelines, hot water supply pipelines for the construction base, and heating networks.

Five 40t GIRAFFE TDK-40.1100 pillar cranes will be used for constructing the internal and boundary walls of the reactor unit of the first power unit of Kursk II. DEMAG CC 6800, a heavy-duty crane, will also be used for constructing the building structures at the reactor buildings.

First concrete for the NPP was poured in April 2018, marking the start of construction of the nuclear island building foundations. The first VVER-TOI reactor. Kursk-II-1 and II-2 will replace Kursk 1 and 2 RBMK which are approaching end of life. As two more VVER-TOI Units are planned, they will eventually replace all four RBMK reactors at Kursk I. The first Kursk RBMK reactor shut down in December 2021 while the first Kursk II Unit is expected to be commissioned by the end of 2022, while the second unit is scheduled to come online in 2023.

First concrete for the NPP was poured in April 2018, marking the start of construction of the nuclear island building foundations. 

The two 3+ generation reactors of Kursk NPP II will be the pilot units of the VVER-TOI project and include a turbine plant featuring a low-speed turbine-generator, manufactured by Power Machines PJSC. The new design will increase the reactor capacity by an additional 25%, when compared to the conventional VVER-1000 reactors. A PS330/10kV substation will provide electric energy for the construction works and to the site’s facilities. The new substation will be connected from 330kV operating outdoor switchgear (OSG) to 330kV overhead power line (OPL).

In January of 2023, the steel dome was set on the unit 1 containment building. Weighing in at 235 tonnes it will serve as a key barrier between the reactor and the environment. This lift raised the overall height of the reactor building to its final height of 64.5 meters (211 feet). The steel dome will then be covered in a thick layer of reinforced concrete forming the containment building.

Reactor data 
The Kursk Nuclear Power Plant has 3 operational units:

See also

 Nuclear power in Russia
 List of nuclear reactors#Russia

References

External links

 Kursk NPP home page at Energoatom (English version).
 About Kursk NPP at Bellona Foundation.

Nuclear power stations built in the Soviet Union
Nuclear power stations in Russia
Nuclear power stations using RBMK reactors